Finstad is a surname of Norwegian origin. Notable people with the surname include:

Arnstein Finstad (born 1978), Norwegian cross-country skier
Brad Finstad (born 1976), American politician
Eva R. Finstad (1933–1998), Norwegian politician
Jonny Finstad (born 1966), Norwegian politician
Kjell G. Finstad (born 1939), Norwegian businessman
Morten Finstad (born 1967), Norwegian former ice hockey player
Ole J. Finstad (1878–1960), American lawyer and politician
Suzanne Finstad (born 1955), American author, biographer, journalist, producer, and lawyer
Thomas Finstad (born 1978), Norwegian footballer

References

Surnames of Norwegian origin